Protitanichthys is an extinct genus of comparatively large coccosteid arthrodire placoderms from the Middle Devonian of the eastern United States. Fossils are found primarily in the Eifelian-epoch aged Delaware Limestone of Ohio, and the Lower Givetian-aged Rockport Quarry Limestone of Michigan

Description
Protitanichthys is very similar to other coccosteids, though the skull is proportionally narrower, and the orbits are comparatively smaller.  As mentioned earlier, species are quite large for coccosteids, with most fossil specimens coming from individuals  in length, with rare fossils from over  individuals. It is surpassed only in size by the Old World genus, Livosteus.

Phylogeny
Protitanichthys is a member of the family Coccosteidae, which belongs to the clade Coccosteomorphi, one of the two major clades within Eubrachythoraci. The cladogram below shows the phylogeny of Protitanichthys:

Species

P. fossatus
The type species of the genus.

P. rockportensis
As the specific name suggests, numerous scrappy remains of this species are found in the Lower-Givetian Rockport Quarry Limestone in Michigan. Denison (1978) questions the status of P. rockportensis being distinct from P. fossatus, as there are very few differences between the two, aside from chronological and geographical differences.

References

Coccosteidae
Placoderms of North America
Paleontology in Ohio
Paleontology in Michigan
Eifelian life
Givetian life